The IMOCA 60 Class yacht PRB, FRA 85 was designed by Finot-Cong and launched in the 15th July 1996 after being built Chantier Nautique Pinta based in La Rochelle, France. The boat capsized during the BOC challenge and was lost although Isabelle Autissier was rescued by fellow competitor Italian G. Soldini. The boat capsized with the keel and keel bulb attached and was unable to right itself despite having a canting keel. Primarily because of the large deck area creating a very wide stable form this led to the coachroof enlarging and moor camber on the deck to make the boats less stable upside down and the introduction of the righting test.

Racing Results

References 

Individual sailing vessels
1990s sailing yachts
Sailing yachts designed by Finot-Conq
Vendée Globe boats
IMOCA 60